Cardiocrinum giganteum, the giant Himalayan lily, is the largest species of any of the lily plants, growing up to 3.5 metres high. It is found in the Himalayas, China and Myanmar (Burma).

Varieties
Two varieties are recognized

C. giganteum var. giganteum - up to 3 metres tall, the outer part of the flower greenish and the inside streaked with purple - Tibet, Bhutan, Assam, Myanmar, Nepal, Sikkim
C. giganteum var. yunnanense - 1–2 metres tall, the outer part of the flower white and the inside streaked with purplish red - Myanmar, Gansu, Guangdong, Guangxi, Guizhou, Henan, Hubei, Hunan, Shaanxi, Sichuan, Yunnan

Description
Cardiocrinum giganteum is a bulbous perennial. Petals have purple streaking and a greenish tinge on the outside. Giganteum means unusually large or tall. It grows in woodland clearings.

History of cultivation

The plant was first described scientifically in 1824 by Nathaniel Wallich. The species was introduced into commercial production (as Lilium giganteum) in Britain in the 1850s. A bulb grown from seed collected by Major Madden flowered in Edinburgh in July 1852, while those collected by Thomas Lobb were first exhibited in flower in May 1853.

References

Liliaceae
Flora of Asia
Plants described in 1824